Marcelle Leblanc is a Miss America's Outstanding Teen titleholder and an actress.

LeBlanc is from Birmingham, Alabama. She began participating in theater at age 11. At age 14, she founded an initiative to provide other children with scholarships to participate in after-school arts programs, in cooperation with the Alabama Arts Alliance non-profit for which she is a state spokesperson.

In December 2019, she entered the Miss Coosa Valley's Outstanding Teen pageant, earned the title of Miss Alabama's Outstanding Teen 2021 in 2020, and won the Miss America's Outstanding Teen 2022 title on July 30, 2021. During the national pageant, she won top overall interview and a preliminary talent competition award, and her title-holding year is dedicated to promoting the arts scholarship organization she founded and lobbying for funding for arts programs.

LeBlanc enrolled at Auburn University in fall 2021, where she joined the Alpha Gamma Delta sorority and plans to major in accounting while continuing to act in film and television.

Filmography 
2021

 The Waltons: Homecoming - Mary Ellen Walton
 Just Beyond, episode "My Monster" - Jade
 PEN15, episode "Jacuzzi" - Venice (voice)
 Fear Street Part Two: 1978 - Becky
 Cobra Kai, episode "Aftermath" -  Stacy

2020

 Super Science Showcase  - Becky Thatcher

2018

 False Profits -  Cassidy
 Union - Josephine
 Criminal Minds, episode "Full-Tilt Boogie" - Dana Gaines

2017

 Father Figures - Schoolgirl (uncredited)
 Stranger Things, episode "Chapter Nine: The Gate" - Cute Girl

References 

American beauty pageant winners
Living people
Miss America's Outstanding Teen
People from Birmingham, Alabama
Year of birth missing (living people)